The Metro Cebu Expressway is a  expressway in Cebu, Philippines. The expressway, once completed, will connect the Cebu North Road (N8) in Danao to the Naga–Uling Road (N81) in Naga. and will serve as an alternative north–south backbone highway for Cebu.

As of 2020, only a portion of the expressway in Barangays Pangdan and Cantao-an in Naga, Cebu, which is part of the project's third segment, has been constructed so far. Its first and second segments are currently on hold until the approval of unsolicited proposals coming from private firms and road right-of-way acquisitions.

References 

Proposed roads in the Philippines

Roads in Cebu